Jasminum mesnyi, the primrose jasmine or Japanese jasmine, is a species of flowering plant in the family Oleaceae, native to Vietnam and southern China (Guizhou, Sichuan, Yunnan). It is also reportedly naturalized in Mexico, Honduras and parts of the southern United States (Florida, Georgia, Alabama, Louisiana, Texas, Arizona).

The form usually found in cultivation has semi-double flowers. It is not frost-hardy. With suitable support it can be grown as a slender climber, though in confined spaces it will require regular pruning.

Jasminum mesnyi has gained the Royal Horticultural Society's Award of Garden Merit.

References

photo of herbarium specimen at Missouri Botanical Garden, collected in Nuevo León, Mexico

mesnyi
Flora of Vietnam
Flora of Guizhou
Flora of Sichuan
Flora of Yunnan
Plants described in 1882
Garden plants